Amalie of Zweibrücken-Birkenfeld-Bischweiler (Maria Amalie Auguste; 10 May 1752 – 15 November 1828) was the last Electress and first Queen of Saxony and Duchess of Warsaw.

Biography 
Amalie was born in Mannheim, the daughter of Count Palatine Frederick Michael of Palatinate-Zweibrücken-Birkenfeld-Bischweiler and his wife, Countess Palatine Maria Francisca of Palatinate-Sulzbach. She was the sister of Maximilian Joseph, later King of Bavaria.

On 29 January 1769 she married the Saxon Elector Frederick Augustus III. In 1806, the Electress and her husband were proclaimed the first King and Queen of Saxony. The following year, Napoleon I made them Duke and Duchess of Warsaw, a newly created principality in Poland.

Amalie bore four children, three of whom were stillborn. Only one daughter, Maria Augusta, attained adulthood, but remained unmarried.
From 1804, at the death of her sister-in-law Carolina of Parma, she and her other sister-in-law, Maria Theresa of Austria, shared the responsibility of raising the former's children, something they are said to have done very strictly.

Amalie died on 15 November 1828 at the age of 76, and was buried in the Hofkirche in Dresden.

Issue
 unnamed child (born/died 1771)
 unnamed child (born/died 1775)
 Maria Augusta Nepomucena Antonia Francisca Xaveria Aloysia (born Dresden 21 June 1782; died Dresden 14 March 1863)
 unnamed child (born/died 1797)

Ancestry

References

|-

|-

|-

1752 births
1828 deaths
Burials at Dresden Cathedral
Electresses of Saxony
Saxon queens consort
House of Wittelsbach
People from Mannheim
House of Wettin
Countesses Palatine of Zweibrücken
⚭Amalie of Zweibrücken-Birkenfeld